Erythrolamprus is a genus of colubrid snakes, commonly known as false coral snakes, native to Central America, the Caribbean, and the northern part of South America. They appear to be coral snake mimics.

Species
These species are currently recognized as being valid.

Erythrolamprus aenigma  – savannah racer snake
Erythrolamprus aesculapii  – Aesculapian false coral snake
Erythrolamprus albertguentheri  – Günther's green liophis
Erythrolamprus albiventris 
Erythrolamprus almadensis  – Almaden ground snake
Erythrolamprus andinus  
Erythrolamprus atraventer  – Dixon's ground snake
Erythrolamprus bizona  – double-banded false coral snake
Erythrolamprus breviceps  – short ground snake
Erythrolamprus carajasensis  
Erythrolamprus ceii  
Erythrolamprus cobella  – mangrove snake
Erythrolamprus cursor  – Lacépède's ground snake or Martinique ground snake (possibly extinct)
Erythrolamprus dorsocorallinus  
Erythrolamprus epinephalus  – fire-bellied snake
Erythrolamprus festae  – drab ground snake
Erythrolamprus fraseri 
Erythrolamprus frenatus  – swamp liophis
Erythrolamprus guentheri  – Günther's false coral snake
Erythrolamprus ingeri 
Erythrolamprus jaegeri  – Jaeger's ground snake
Erythrolamprus janaleeae 
Erythrolamprus juliae  – Julia's ground snake
Erythrolamprus lamonae 
Erythrolamprus macrosomus 
Erythrolamprus maryellenae  – Maryellen's ground snake
Erythrolamprus melanotus  – Shaw's dark ground snake
Erythrolamprus mertensi  – Mertens's tropical forest snake
Erythrolamprus miliaris  – military ground snake
Erythrolamprus mimus  – mimic false coral snake
Erythrolamprus mossoroensis 
Erythrolamprus ocellatus  – Tobago false coral snake, red snake 
Erythrolamprus oligolepis  
Erythrolamprus ornatus  – Saint Lucia racer, ornate ground snake
†Erythrolamprus perfuscus  – tan ground snake, Barbados racer (extinct)
Erythrolamprus poecilogyrus 
Erythrolamprus pseudocorallus  – false coral snake
Erythrolamprus pseudoreginae  Tobago stream snake 
Erythrolamprus pyburni  – Pyburn's tropical forest snake
Erythrolamprus pygmaeus  – Amazon tropical forest snake
Erythrolamprus reginae  – royal ground snake
Erythrolamprus rochai 
Erythrolamprus sagittifer  – arrow ground snake
Erythrolamprus semiaureus  
Erythrolamprus subocularis  
Erythrolamprus taeniogaster  
Erythrolamprus taeniurus  – thin ground snake
Erythrolamprus torrenicola  – velvety swamp snake
Erythrolamprus trebbaui 
Erythrolamprus triscalis  – three-scaled ground snake
Erythrolamprus typhlus  – blind ground snake, velvet swamp snake
Erythrolamprus viridis  – crown ground snake
Erythrolamprus vitti  
Erythrolamprus williamsi  – Williams' ground snake
Erythrolamprus zweifeli  – braided ground snake, Zweifel's ground snake

Nota bene: A binomial authority in parentheses indicates that the species was originally described in a genus other than Erythrolamprus.

Mimicry
The brightly colored, ringed patterns of some of the snakes of the genus Erythrolamprus resemble those of sympatric coral snakes of the genus Micrurus, and it has been suggested that this is due to mimicry. Whether this is classical Batesian mimicry, classical Müllerian mimicry, a modified form of Müllerian mimicry, or no mimicry at all, remains to be proven.

Cited references

Further reading
Beolens, Bo; Watkins, Michael; Grayson, Michael (2011). The Eponym Dictionary of Reptiles. Baltimore: Johns Hopkins University Press. xiii + 296 pp. . (Liophis atraventer, p. 73; L. guentheri, p. 111; L. jaegeri, p. 132; l. juliae, p. 137; L. melanotus, p. 241; Umbrivaga mertensi, p. 176; Geophis pyburni, p. 213; Liophis williamsi, p. 286; L. reginae zweifeli, p. 294).
Wagler, J[G] (1830). Natürliches System der AMPHIBIEN, mit vorangehender Classification der SAÜGTHIERE und VÖGEL. Ein Beitrag zur vergleichenden Zoologie. Munich, Stuttgart, and Tübingen: J.G. Cotta. vi + 354 pp. (Erythrolamprus, new genus, p. 187). (in German and Latin).

 
Snake genera
Taxa named by Johann Georg Wagler